The Chūgoku Progressive Party (Chūgoku Shimpotō) was a political party in Japan.

History
The party was established in 1894 by five Okayama-based MPs who had left the Rikken Kakushintō. Led by Inukai Tsuyoshi, it won four seats in the September 1894 elections.

In February 1896 it merged with Rikken Kaishintō, Rikken Kakushintō, Teikoku Zaisei Kakushin-kai and Ōte Club to form Shimpotō.

References

Defunct political parties in Japan
Political parties established in 1894
1894 establishments in Japan
Political parties disestablished in 1896
1896 disestablishments in Japan